The 2014–15 Costa Rican FPD was the 95th season of the Costa Rican top-flight football league. It was divided into two championships: the Invierno [winter] and Verano [summer] seasons.

The Invierno season was dedicated to Manuel Antonio "Pilo" Obando.

Teams
The league was contested by a total of 12 teams, including Puma Generaleña, promoted from the 2013–14 Liga de Ascenso. While Puntarenas were relegated.

Personnel, kits and Stadia
Note: Table lists in alphabetical order.

Managerial changes

During the season

Campeonato de Invierno
The tournament began on 15 August 2014, with Carmelita defeating Limón 2–0, with Guatemalan player Angelo Padilla scoring the first goal of the tournament. It ended on 21 December 2014, with Saprissa winning their 31st title after they overcome Herediano in the final.

First Stage

Standings

Results

Second stage

Semifinals
First legs

Second legs

Finals 
First leg

Second leg

Top scorers

Source:

List of foreign players in the league
This is a list of foreign players in Invierno 2014. The following players:
have played at least one apertura game for the respective club.
have not been capped for the Costa Rica national football team on any level, independently from the birthplace

A new rule was introduced a few season ago, that clubs can only have three foreign players per club and can only add a new player if there is an injury or player/s is released.

Alajuelense
  Ramon Nunez
  Jerry Palacios

Belén
  José Carlos Cancela

Carmelita
  Angelo Padilla

Cartaginés
  Luciano Bostal
  Paolo Cardozo
  Leandro Silva

Herediano
  Keven Alemán
  Alexander Larin
  Antonio Pedroza
  Gabriel Enrique Gómez
  Brunet Hay

Limón
  Rodrigo Lucas Martella

 (player released during the season)

Pérez Zeledón
  Tomas Fonseca
  Maurim
  Andrés Santamaría
  Óscar McFarlane
  Fabrizio Ronchetti

Puma Generaleña
  Yamir Vergara

Saprissa
  Carlos Saucedo
  Rafael Morales
  Adolfo Machado

Santos
  Ismael Fuentes
  Jorge Hernández
  Antonio Salazar

Universidad de Costa Rica
  Jorge Barbosa
  Pablo Madrigal
  Omar Royero

Uruguay
  Jeffrey Brooks Martines

Campeonato de Verano
The tournament will begin in January 2015.

Personnel and sponsoring (2015 Verano)

During the season

First Stage

Standings

Results

Second stage

Semifinals
First legs

Second legs

Finals 
First leg

Second leg

Top goalscorers

List of foreign players in the league
This is a list of foreign players in Verano 2015. The following players:
have played at least one Verano game for the respective club.
have not been capped for the Costa Rica national football team on any level, independently from the birthplace

A new rule was introduced a few season ago, that clubs can only have three foreign players per club and can only add a new player if there is an injury or player/s is released.

Alajuelense
  Yvanilton de Almeida
  Leonel Peralta

Belén
  Brunet Hay
  Carlos Elizalde Gomez
  Misael Martín Reynoso
  David Arguello Escobar

Carmelita
  Angelo Padilla
  Víctor Ortiz
  Lucas Monzón

Cartaginés
  William Palacio
  Fabrizio Ronchetti

Herediano
  Alexander Larin
  Luis Omar Hernández
  Gabriel Enrique Gómez
  Jonathan Hansen

Limón
  Ismael Gómez 
  Walter Ariel Silva

 (player released during the season)

Pérez Zeledón
  Tomas Fonseca
  Camilo Aguirre
  Christian Yeladian
  José Carlos Cancela	

Puma Generaleña
  David Daniels Gittens
  Luis Fernando Copete 
  Raúl Leguías
  Lucas Carrera

Saprissa
  Andrés Imperiale
  Adolfo Machado
  Sebastián Diana

Santos
  Jonathan López
  Osman Elis Martínez

Universidad de Costa Rica
  Jorge Barbosa
  Maximiliano Joell Silva

Uruguay
  Gustavo Udrizard 
  Bruno Weisser

Overall standings

References

External links
 https://web.archive.org/web/20140809055429/http://unafut.com/site/
 http://www.nacion.com/deportes/futbol-costa-rica/
 http://www.everardoherrera.com/index.php/futbol-nacional 

Liga FPD seasons
1
Costa